is a collection of instrumental compositions by Georg Philipp Telemann (1681–1767), published in 1733. The work is one of Telemann's most widely known compositions; it is the climax and at the same time one of the last examples of courtly table music.

Publication 
The composition addressed predominantly wealthy music lovers. The complete set of parts of the extensive work, engraved in copper, cost 8 Reichsthaler — an exorbitant price, considering the fact that Johann Sebastian Bach received the same sum as remuneration for a complete orchestra at a court concert.

More than 200 subscribers were found who were willing to pay the price in advance and whose name, social status, and address were published in the first edition. The illustrious list comprised crowned heads, noblewomen, and merchants as well as German and non-German musicians and composers — among others George Frideric Handel from London, Johann Georg Pisendel and Johann Joachim Quantz from Dresden and Michel Blavet from Paris.

Telemann, who was music director of Hamburg at the time of publication, wrote:
This work will hopefully bring me glory one day; but you will never have regrets about its value ...

Max Seiffert proved 18 different citations from the Tafelmusik in Handel's works — in their time this was not considered plagiarism. Quite on the contrary, Telemann felt flattered, the more so as Handel reciprocated by procuring rare plants for his old friend.

Structure 
The work consists of three parts with equal structure: they begin with an overture for full-scale orchestra, followed by a quartet for three instruments and continuo, an instrumental concerto for several solo instruments and strings, a trio sonata and a solo sonata with continuo. The final movements are titled Conclusion by Telemann: he resumes the key and instrumentation of the overture; beyond that, keys and instrumentation follow no discernible scheme.

With overture, concert, trio and solo sonata and the — in Baroque times — rare quartet, each part offers an example of the most important instrumental genres.

1. Production 
Ouverture (Suite) in e minor, TWV 55:e1 for two flutes, strings and continuo

Quartet in G major, TWV 43:G2 for flute, oboe, violin and continuo

Concerto in A major,  TWV 53:A2 for flute, violin, violoncello, strings and continuo

Trio in E-flat major, TWV 42:Es1 for two violins and continuo

Sonata in B minor, TWV 41:h4 for flute and continuo

Conclusion in e minor, TWV 50:5 for two flutes, strings and continuo
 Sinfonia

2. Production 
Ouverture (Suite) in D major, TWV 55:D1 for oboe, trumpet, strings and continuo

Quartet in d minor, TWV 43:d1 for two flutes, recorder (or bassoon) and continuo

Concerto in F major, TWV 53:F1 for three violins, strings and continuo

Trio in e minor, TWV 42:e2 for flute, oboe and continuo

Sonate in A major, TWV 41:A4 for violin and continuo

Conclusion in D major, TWV 50:9 for oboe, trumpet, strings and continuo
 Allegro – Adagio – Allegro

3. Production 
Overture (Suite) in B-flat major, TWV 55:B1 for two oboes, bassoon, strings, continuo

Quartet in e minor, TWV 43:e2 for flute, violin, violoncello and continuo

Concerto in E-flat major, TWV 54:Es1 for two horns, strings and continuo

Trio in D major, TWV 42:D5 for two flutes and continuo

Sonata in g minor, TWV 41:g6 for oboe and continuo

Conclusion in B-flat major, TWV 50:10 for two oboes, bassoon, strings, continuo
 Furioso

External links 
  (edition by Max Seiffert, Denkmäler deutscher Tonkunst)

Compositions by Georg Philipp Telemann
1733 compositions